Three Rivers Park District is a special park district serving the suburban areas of the Twin Cities including suburban Hennepin, Carver, Dakota, Scott, and Ramsey counties. Three Rivers's mission is "To promote environmental stewardship through recreation and education in a natural resources-based park system." Three Rivers operates twenty parks and ten regional trails, with at least two more regional trails planned. Nearly seven million people visit Three Rivers facilities each year.

History
A park system in Hennepin County outside of Minneapolis was proposed as early as 1901, but it was not until 1955 that the Minnesota Legislature passed the legislation that cleared the way to establish the park system in 1957. It was then known as the Hennepin County Park Reserve District. In 1967, the Park District began efforts to restore wetland, prairie, woodland, and wildlife habitat to their natural state before 19th-century settlement. The district's policy is now that at least 80% of the land in a park reserve must be maintained or restored to its natural state, with only 20% of the land or less developed for recreation. Not all the parks in the system are park reserves; some of the smaller or more-developed parks are "regional parks".

Beginning in the 1970s, the district's focus shifted from land acquisition to development. The building of recreational facilities including park buildings, beaches, boat launches, paved trails for hiking and biking, and cross-country ski trails began in earnest.

In 2005 the park system was renamed Three Rivers Park District to better reflect the areas it serves. Each of the Park District's facilities has watersheds that flow into three rivers: the Mississippi, Minnesota and Crow. These rivers have historically been and continue to be significant in the lives of the region's residents. 

The park system's current chair is John Gunyou.

Parks
Most Three Rivers Park District parks are open from 5 a.m. through 10 p.m.

Baker Park Reserve
Its highlights include the Baker Near-Wilderness Settlement retreat, available for use by families and groups, and Baker National Golf Course. It has  of paved biking/hiking trails. There is a mountain biking trail available by special-use permit in the winter.

Bryant Lake Regional Park
It features a swimming beach on Bryant Lake, a disc golf course, and a mix of paved and unpaved trails.

Carver Park Reserve
It is also connected to the Southwest LRT Trail's northern branch. The Grimm Farm Historic Site serves as a museum within the reserve.

Cleary Lake Regional Park
Cleary Lake Regional Park is located near Prior Lake, in Scott County.

Mississippi Gateway Regional Park 

Mississippi Gateway Regional Park, formerly Coon Rapids Dam Regional Park, is located in Brooklyn Park, Minnesota and Coon Rapids, Minnesota. The dam, for which the park was named, was built by Northern States Power Company in 1913 for electrical power generation. Power generation was discontinued in 1966, so the dam is now used for recreation. Anoka County operates a park on its side of the dam.
There is a pedestrian and bicycle walkway across the Dam.
This park and the Coon Rapids Dam East, a walk across the dam, are sites for the National Parks Passport Program for the Mississippi National River and Recreation Area. The park has a staffed visitor's center with restrooms. There are picnic shelters along the pedestrian trail. Various wildlife can be seen throughout the year.

Crow-Hassan Park Reserve
The park features  of unpaved hiking trails,  of horse trails, and an off-leash dog area.

Eagle Lake Regional Park
Eagle Lake Regional Park is located in Plymouth, Minnesota and Maple Grove, Minnesota and features a nine-hole golf course with a lighted driving range.

Elm Creek Park Reserve
It features  of paved biking/hiking trails,  of horse trails, and a  mountain bike trail. It also has a championship level disc golf course and a popular chlorinated swimming pond and a creative play area. Elm Creek also has a large fully fenced off-leash dog area.

A regional trail system connects Elm Creek Park Reserve to Fish Lake Regional Park and Coon Rapids Dam Regional Park. In the winter, portions of the  cross-country ski trail system are served by snowmaking. They also offer a snowtubing hill and a small downhill ski/snowboard area featuring a small terrain park. The Eastman Nature Center provides interpretive programs.

Fish Lake Regional Park
Fish Lake Regional Park is located in Maple Grove and offers boat access to Fish Lake, as well as a swimming beach and four-season pavilion.  Also, there is a fully fenced, off-leash dog area.

Clifton E. French Regional Park
Located on Medicine Lake in Plymouth, Clifton E. French Regional Park (referred to locally as French Park) contains a popular creative play area and a large Nature Exploration Area, where patrons do not have to stay on paths and may do activities that are forbidden elsewhere in the park, such as digging or building forts. It also includes boat access to Medicine Lake. In the winter, it has  of cross-country ski trails. The park is connected to Medicine Lake Regional Trail.

Gale Woods
Gale Woods, located on the shores of Whaletale Lake in Minnetrista, is a working farm featuring interpretive programs where visitors can learn about agriculture and land stewardship. The farm is home to the Gale Woods Folk School, which offers classes in cooking and the fiber arts. The park also includes a barn-style pavilion overlooking the lake.

Glen Lake Golf and Practice Center
Glen Lake Golf and Practice Center is located on the boundary of Minnetonka and Eden Prairie. It features a popular nine-hole golf course, along with a driving range and practice areas. It is built on the site of the former Glen Lake Sanatorium.

The Landing
The Landing – Minnesota River Heritage Park, formerly Historic Murphy's Landing, in Shakopee, is a regional park featuring a number of restored buildings from the 19th century. Buildings from the 1840s to the 1880s illustrate what life was like for some of Minnesota's earliest settlers along the Minnesota River. The site is open to the public daily for walking, biking and self-guided activities. Special programs take visitors inside the buildings. School groups tours are also available along with summer camps, and seasonal program offerings.

Hyland Lake Park Reserve
 Hyland Lake Park Reserve, located in Bloomington, features the Hyland Hills Ski Area, a downhill ski area with two terrain parks. The park is home to a massive creative play area that is a favorite of local residents. The ski area is popular for lessons and for its proximity to the metro area. On Hyland Lake at the playground there is a chalet with a concessions stand and tables and chairs. During the winter the chalet has cross country ski rentals. The rest of the park reserve's  contain  of paved biking/hiking trails and other unpaved hiking trails. In addition, the park features an 18-hole championship-level disc golf course playing along the ski slopes. The visitor's center offers boat and kayak rentals for use on Hyland Lake. In the winter,  of cross-country ski trails are offered, and some trails are lit for evening use. Hyland Lake Park Reserve also hosts Richardson Nature Center. The center offers live animal displays, interpretive nature programs and winter snowshoe rentals. The creative play in Hyland Lake Park Reserve features a wide variety of slides and other playground equipment. This playground is called "Chutes & Ladders" by Minnesotans because just the like the popular games its massive playground is mostly ladders leading to chutes "slides".

Lake Minnetonka Regional Park
Located in Minnetrista, Lake Minnetonka Regional Park is a relatively new park in the Three Rivers system. It offers a chlorinated sand-bottom swimming pond and a creative play area. It also provides boat access to Lake Minnetonka.

Lake Rebecca Park Reserve
It offers  of biking/hiking trails,  of unpaved hiking trails, and a  mountain bike trail. It also has a non-motorized lake for canoeing, rowing, and fishing.

Murphy-Hanrehan Park Reserve
Murphy-Hanrehan Park Reserve, in Burnsville, Lakeville, Savage, and Credit River Township, features a hilly cross-country ski trail system and a hilly  singletrack mountain bike trail, maintained by Minnesota Off-Road Cyclists. The mountain bike trail is probably one of the most challenging trails in the Twin Cities due to its long climbs and rapid descents. The trail also includes natural and man-made obstacles such as rocks, wooden bridges, logs and stairsteps. It is the only known nesting site of the hooded warbler in Minnesota.

Noerenberg Memorial Gardens
Noerenberg Memorial Gardens, located in Orono, is considered one of Minnesota's finest formal public gardens. It was donated to the park reserve by the estate of Frederick Noerenberg, founder of the Grain Belt brewery. The gardens are open May through October for tours, programs, informal viewing, and weddings.

North Mississippi Regional Park
North Mississippi Regional Park is located on the west bank of the Mississippi River on the border of Minneapolis and Brooklyn Center. It has a scenic view of the river and surrounding woods, along with a paved biking/hiking trail that connects to the Minneapolis trail system and to the Anoka County Park trails that go north to the Coon Rapids Dam.

Silverwood Park
Silverwood is the park district's newest acquisition. Located on the northwest shore of Silver Lake in St. Anthony, it was formerly the site of the Salvation Army Silver Lake Camp. Silverwood serves as a regional center devoted to connecting the community with the natural world and artistic creation. Through a gallery space, an amphitheater, art circles, and classrooms, artists engage and inspire the community with exhibitions, creations, teaching and performance. The park also features a coffee shop specializing in local, natural, organic, and sustainable foods. Picnicking, hiking trails and fishing are also available.

Trails

Cedar Lake LRT Regional Trail

Cedar Lake LRT Regional Trail runs from downtown Minneapolis to Hopkins along former railroad lines. It connects to other trails including Luce Line Regional Trail, North Cedar Lake Regional Trail, and Minnesota River Bluffs LRT Regional Trail. It is part of the Southwest LRT Trail

Dakota Rail Regional Trail

The Dakota Rail Regional Trail follows the former Dakota Rail Corridor along the north side of Lake Minnetonka. The trail runs  from Wayzata southwest to St. Bonifacius.

Lake Independence Regional Trail
The Lake Independence Regional Trail is a paved trail which runs from Crow-Hassan Park Reserve in Corcoran through Baker Park Reserve to the Luce Line State Trail in Orono.

Lake Minnetonka LRT Regional Trail

Lake Minnetonka LRT Regional Trail is a limestone trail which runs from Hopkins to Victoria, where it connects to Carver Park Reserve. It is part of the Southwest LRT Trail.

Luce Line Regional Trail

Luce Line Regional Trail is a paved trail which runs  from Theodore Wirth Park in Golden Valley to Plymouth, where it becomes the Luce Line State Trail. In Plymouth Luce Line Regional Trail connects with Medicine Lake Regional Trail.

Medicine Lake Regional Trail
Medicine Lake Regional Trail is a paved trail which runs from Elm Creek Park Reserve in Maple Grove to Luce Line Regional Trail on the south end of Medicine Lake. In between, the trail runs through Fish Lake Regional Park and Clifton E. French Regional Park. A short branch of the trail extends east of French Park into the surrounding neighborhood, ending at a city park.

Minnesota River Bluffs LRT Regional Trail

Minnesota River Bluffs LRT Regional Trail is a limestone trail which runs from Hopkins to Chanhassen along the former Minneapolis and St. Louis Railway line. In Hopkins the trail connects to Cedar Lake LRT Regional Trail and North Cedar Lake Regional Trail. It is part of the Southwest LRT Trail.

Nine Mile Creek Regional Trail

Nine Mile Creek Regional Trail is a paved trail which runs from the Cedar Lake LRT Regional Trail in Hopkins to the Nokomis-MN River Trail in Bloomington.

North Cedar Lake Regional Trail

North Cedar Lake Regional Trail is a paved trail which runs from Minneapolis to Hopkins, where it connects to Cedar Lake LRT Regional Trail and Minnesota River Bluffs LRT Regional Trail. North Cedar Lake Regional Trail forms part of the Cedar Lake Loop, along with Cedar Lake Regional Trail, Cedar Lake LRT Trail, Midtown Greenway, and the Kenilworth Trail.

Rush Creek Regional Trail
Rush Creek Regional Trail is a paved  trail which connects Elm Creek Park Reserve and Mississippi Gateway Regional Park. It also connects to Shingle Creek Regional Trail, although three rivers is planning on extending the trail to Crow Hassen regional park

Shingle Creek Regional Trail
Shingle Creek Regional Trail is a paved trail that runs from Rush Creek Regional Trail in Brooklyn Center down into Brooklyn Park, where it connects to local trails.

Planned Trails

Bassett Creek Regional Trail
Basset Creek Regional Trail is a paved trail that connects Clifton E. French Regional Park to Theodore Wirth Park.

Crystal Lake Regional Trail

Crystal Lake Regional Trail is a 8.6-mile paved trail from the Minneapolis Grand Rounds at Victory Memorial Parkway to Elm Creek Park Reserve. It will largely run parallel to the Bottineau Boulevard Corridor. Along its route the trail will connect to Grand Rounds Trail near Lowry Avenue.

See also 
 List of shared-use paths in Minneapolis

References

External links 
 Three Rivers Park District site
 Three Rivers Park District News, May 26, 2011
 Three Rivers Park District News, May 13 2011

Regional parks in Minnesota
Protected areas of Hennepin County, Minnesota
Protected areas of Scott County, Minnesota
Protected areas established in 1957
Park districts in the United States
Protected areas of Carver County, Minnesota
Protected areas of Dakota County, Minnesota